The following is a partial list of social science journals, including history and area studies. There are thousands of academic journals covering the social sciences in publication, and many more have been published at various points in the past. The list given here is far from exhaustive, and contains the most influential, currently publishing journals in each field. As a rule of thumb, each field should be represented by at most ten positions, chosen by their impact factors and other ratings. There are many important academic magazines that are not true peer-reviewed journals. They are not listed here.

For a list of periodicals in the physical, life, and applied sciences, see List of scientific journals.

Anthropology 
American Anthropologist
Chungara
Culture, Theory and Critique
Cultural Survival
Current Anthropology
Evolutionary Anthropology
Social Evolution & History
Structure and Dynamics: eJournal of the Anthropological and Related Sciences
Terrain

Archaeology 
African Archaeological Review
American Antiquity
American Journal of Archaeology
Ancient TL
Antiquity
Arabian Archaeology and Epigraphy
International Journal of South American Archaeology
Journal of Archaeological Science
Journal of Anthropological Archaeology
Journal of Archaeological Method and Theory
Latin American Antiquity

Area studies 

Abbia: Cameroon Cultural Review
American Journal of Chinese Studies
American Quarterly
Azure
Central Asia Monitor
Central Asian Review
Central European Journal of International and Security Studies
Debatte: Journal of Contemporary Central and Eastern Europe
Harvard Journal of Asiatic Studies
Forum Italicum
Iranian Studies Journal
Journal of the American Research Center in Egypt
Journal of Asian Studies
Journal of Japanese Studies
Journal of Latin American Studies
Journal of Modern Greek Studies
Journal of Near Eastern Studies
Monumenta Nipponica
Norte Grande Geography Journal
Pacific Northwest Quarterly
Palestine-Israel Journal
Problems of Post-Communism
Revista Universum
Sarmatian Review
SOAS Bulletin of Burma Research

Business, management & organization theory 
Academy of Management Review
Academy of Management Journal
Business and Professional Communication Quarterly
Business Process Management Journal
International Marketing Review
International Small Business Journal
Journal of Media Business Studies
Management Science
Measuring Business Excellence
Organization Development Journal
Organization Science
Administrative Science Quarterly
Journal of Management
Strategic Management Journal

Communication 

Communication Monographs
Communication Research
Communication Theory
Human Communication Research
Journal of Communication

Demography 
Canadian Studies in Population
Demography
International Migration Review
Journal of Population Economics
Population and Development Review

Economics 

American Economic Review
Economic Journal
Journal of Economic Literature
Journal of Financial Economics
Journal of Political Economy
Quarterly Journal of Economics

Education and educational technology 

American Educational Research Journal
American Journal of Education
College Teaching
Educational Administration Quarterly
Educational Researcher
Educational Technology & Society
Harvard Educational Review
Journal of Higher Education
Research in Learning Technology
Review of Educational Research
Studies in Higher Education
Teachers College Record

Environmental social science 

 Ecology and Society
 Environmental Research Letters
 Environmental Values
 Journal of Political Ecology
 Nature and Culture
 Organization & Environment
 Population and Environment

Geography 
 Antipode
 Area
 The Geographical Journal
 Journal of Biogeography
 Journal of Quaternary Science
 Polar Research
 The Professional Geographer
 Transactions of the Institute of British Geographers

History 

 American Historical Review
 Journal of American History
 Journal of the American Research Center in Egypt
 Past & Present

Interdisciplinary Social Science 
Asian Journal of Social Science
 Behavioral and Social Sciences LibrarianInformation & MediaMethodology The Social Science Journal Surveillance & Society Social Science Research Law 

 California Law Review Harvard Law Review Law & Critique Michigan Law Review Stanford Law Review Yale Law JournalMedicine
 Social Science & Medicine Planning 

 Environment and Planning Journal of Planning Education and Research Journal of Planning History Journal of Planning Literature Planning Theory Urban Geography Political science 

 American Journal of Political Science American Political Science Review Annual Review of Political Science Comparative Politics Journal of Conflict Resolution Journal of Democracy Journal of Politics & Society Political Geography Psychology 

 Semiotics 
 The American Journal of Semiotics Semiotica Sign Systems Studies Social policy 
 Critical Social Policy Global Social Policy International Journal of Social Welfare Journal of Disability Policy Studies Journal of European Social Policy Social Choice and Welfare Social work 
 Children & Society Clinical Social Work Journal International Social Work Journal of Social Work Qualitative Social Work Research on Social Work Practice Sociology 

 American Journal of Sociology American Sociological Review Annual Review of Sociology British Journal of Sociology Corvinus Journal of Sociology and Social Policy Social Forces Tourism 

 International Journal of Tourism Sciences Women's studies 

 Asian Women Gender & Society Journal of Women's Health Psychology of Women Quarterly Sex Roles Women & Health Women's Health Issues''

See also 
 List of journals available free online
 List of academic databases and search engines
 Wikibook Textbook

External links 
 

 
Lists of academic journals